"Off With Their Heads" is the sixth single by British rapper Devlin, and the second single from Devlin's second studio album A Moving Picture (2013), the song was released in the United Kingdom on 10 October 2012 and features British rapper Wretch 32. The song was written by James Devlin and Jermaine Scott and produced by Drop Lamond.

Music video
A music video to accompany the release of "Off With Their Heads" was first released onto YouTube on 21 October 2012 at a total length of four minutes and nineteen seconds.

Track listings
Digital download
 "Off With Their Heads" (Explicit) (featuring Wretch 32) — 4:06
 "Off With Their Heads" (Clean) (featuring Wretch 32) — 4:06

Credits and personnel
Lead vocals – Devlin, Wretch 32
Lyrics – James Devlin, Jermaine Scott
Label: Universal Music Group, Island Records
Producer: Robbie "Drop" Lamond

Chart performance

Release history

References

2012 singles
2012 songs
Devlin (rapper) songs
Wretch 32 songs
Island Records singles
Songs written by Wretch 32